The 1994 Speedway World Team Cup was the 35th edition of the FIM Speedway World Team Cup to determine the team world champions.

The format changed after the World Team Cup merged with the Speedway World Pairs Championship. Teams now consisted of just two riders with a reserve rider available if needed.

The final took place on 18 September at the Holsteinring at Brokstedt in Germany. Sweden won their seventh title, which was their first for 24 years since the 1970 Speedway World Team Cup.

Qualification

Group C

 July 5, 1994
  Ljubljana

Slovenia and Latvia to Group B

Group B

 July 3, 1994
  Lonigo

Norway and Italy to Group A.

Group A

 September 4, 1994
  Wroclaw

Australia and Poland to Final.

World Final
 September 18, 1994
  Brokstedt, Holsteinring Brokstedt

See also
 1994 Individual Speedway World Championship

References

1994
World T